Dihydroergocristine is an ergot alkaloid. Alongside dihydroergocornine and dihydroergocryptine, it is one of the components of ergoloid mesylates.

References

Ergot alkaloids
Isopropyl compounds
Lactams
Lysergamides
Oxazolopyrrolopyrazines
Vasodilators